"Koochy" is a song by American DJ Armand Van Helden. It was released on May 8, 2000, as the lead single from his fourth studio album, Killing Puritans (2000). It heavily samples Gary Numan's 1979 single "Cars". Although the lyric seems to comprise sexual references, the title actually points back to Numan's song, as the word "kocsi" means "car" in Hungarian.

Track listings

UK CD1
 "Koochy" (edit)
 "Koochy" (long version)
 "Phreeknik"

UK CD2
 "Koochy" (edit)
 "U Don't Know Me" (edit)
 "Reservoir Dogs"

UK cassette single
 "Koochy" (edit)
 "U Don't Know Me" (edit)

Australian CD single
 "Koochy" (edit)
 "Koochy" (long version)
 "Phreeknik"
 "U Don't Know Me" (edit)

Charts

References

2000 singles
2000 songs
Armand Van Helden songs
FFRR Records singles
Songs written by Armand Van Helden
Songs written by Gary Numan